The Top 100 Dutch heritage sites is a list of rijksmonuments in the Netherlands, established in 1990 by the Department for Conservation (Monumentenzorg, today the Rijksdienst voor het Cultureel Erfgoed). The Top 100 was a selection of historical monuments that were authorized to display the symbol of the Hague Convention of 1954 (the famous blue and white shield, known as the UNESCO shield). The list should not be confused with the UNESCO World Heritage list. The buildings on the list could expect extra security in the context of the policy. The Top 100 list is no longer official, as the extra cultural protection policy is no longer applied. The following Top 100 also includes a list of the most important stained glass, church bells and organs.

References
Top 100 der Nederlandse UNESCO-monumenten (2006)
Rijksmonuments
Heritage registers in the Netherlands
Netherlands history-related lists